Jayasekara is a Sinhalese name that may refer to the following people:
 
Surname
Dayasiri Jayasekara (born 1969), Sri Lankan politician
P.B Jayasekara, Sri Lankan writer and translator
Premalal Jayasekara (born 1974), Sri Lankan politician and convicted murderer
 
Forename
Jayasekara Aponsu (born 1951), Sri Lankan actor

See also

Sinhalese masculine given names
Sinhalese surnames